The Margarines were a Japanese idol girl group.

Concept
The Margarines was founded with the purpose of clearing their members' debts of about ¥127 million and the idea that "people with big debt have big dreams."

Members

Discography

References

External links
 

Japanese idol groups
Japanese girl groups
Musical groups established in 2014
2014 establishments in Japan